Binter Canarias S.A. is the flag carrier of the Spanish autonomous community of the Canary Islands, based on the grounds of Gran Canaria Airport in Telde, Gran Canaria and Tenerife North Airport, San Cristóbal de La Laguna, Spain. It is a regional air carrier operating inter-island services within the Canary Islands, and other Atlantic islands, it also operates to the Spanish Mainland and some European destinations, mainly in France and Italy with its brand new Embraer E2, having been the launch customer for the 195 series. Affiliated airlines operate on behalf of Binter in services to Morocco, Mainland-Spain, Portugal and Western Sahara.

History
The airline was established on 18 February 1988 and started operations on 26 March 1989. It was formed as a subsidiary of Iberia. Binter Canarias began operations as a regional airline and is currently the only one to operate in the eight airports of the Canaries. Binter also operates connections with Marrakech, Dakar, Aaiun in Africa; Madeira, and Lisbon in Portugal; Sal in Cape Verde; and Vigo and Mallorca in Spain . The airline also flies to the island of Madeira, serving the capital Funchal. Regular flights to the cities of Bergamo and Paris, were trialled but later cancelled as unsuccessful projects. Nowadays has regular flights to Lisbon and Cape Verde for renting technical crew and aircraft (CRJ) to Air Nostrum. The airline also serves Africa: it operates scheduled flights to Marrakech and Casablanca in Morocco and Laayoune in Western Sahara, alongside charter flights to Nouadibou and Nouakchott in Mauritania.

In late 1999 SEPI (the Spanish state holding company of Iberia) implemented the privatisation of Binter Canarias, but held on to a "golden share", permitting it to authorise any future shareholding deal of more than 25%. However, the airline was wholly owned by Hesperia Inversiones Aéreas, which bought the airline in July 2002. In 2003 Binter Canarias, SAU was absorbed by Hesperia Inversiones Aéreas, SA, which took the name of Binter Canarias, SA. It is now owned by Ilsamar Tenerife (49.81%), Ferma Canarias Electrica (10.44%), Agencia Maritima Afroamericana (10.11%), Flapa (10%) and others (19.6%) and has 406 employees. Binter has sales offices, Binter Vende, at the airports and, since 2005, the ground support service has been provided by Atlántica Handling. Since January 2008 the technical service for Binter aircraft has been provided by BinterTechnic.

Some of the owners of Binter Canarias decided to buy Navegacion y Servicios Aéreos Canarios (NAYSA) and to transfer some planes from Binter to NAYSA in order to reduce costs and increase benefits.

In 2016 the airline agreed a deal for a further six ATR 72-600 aircraft, bringing total commitments to the type to 18. They will replace ATR 72-500 aircraft. In spring 2018, Binter decided to merge Navegacion y Servicios Aéreos Canarios (NAYSA) into its own operations and therefore handed back NAYSA's air operator certificate. Since then, all former NAYSA operations are part of Binter's.

Since late 2017, Binter Cabo Verde took over inter-island flights in Cape Verde after the discontinuation of flights by TACV on 1 August 2017, as TACV was restructuring and privatising. Binter CV established a partnership covering TACV's international services, allowing TACV to offer connections to domestic destinations and seeking to strengthen inter-island connections. In 2019, Binter Cabo Verde was renamed as Transportes Interilhas de Cabo Verde (TICV) and, in 2021, the Canarian company sold its 70% stake in the airline to BestFly Worldwide, thus completing its divestment.

In June 2018 it began the domestic operation between Madeira and Porto Santo Islands in the northern neighboring Madeiran archipelago.

Destinations

As of July 2022, Binter Canarias serves the following destinations:

Fleet

Current fleet

, Binter Canarias operates the following aircraft:

Fleet development
The first new Embraer E195-E2 aircraft has entered passenger service in December 2019, Binter Canarias being the European launch customer. Further the airline has converted two options for this type to firm orders.

Previous fleet
The Binter Canarias fleet has previously included the Boeing 737-400 (leased from Futura International, in a special livery), the ATR 72-202 (the predecessor to their ATR 72-500 and later their ATR 72-600 aircraft), the CASA 235 (the first aircraft operated by Binter), and the Bombardier CRJ-200, CRJ-900 and CRJ1000 aircraft (all CRJ aircraft were leased from Air Nostrum).

Accidents and incidents 
 On 18 October 2016, an ATR 72-600 operated by NAYSA diverted to Gran Canaria Airport, Canary Islands, Spain, due to problems with the left hand main landing gear. The aircraft operated on a training flight, RSC001K, out of Tenerife-Norte Los Rodeos Airport. Upon returning to Tenerife, it was detected that one or both tires of the left hand main gear had burst or deflated. It was decided to divert to Las Palmas where the aircraft flew two low passes over runway 03L. A safe landing was then carried out at 12:22 UTC.

Accolades
The airline was named Europe's best regional airline in 2005 (a celebratory livery was installed on their single Boeing 737-400) and, in September 2010, it was announced that the Spanish carrier had won the European Regions Airline Association (ERA) Gold Award for the best Airline of the Year 2010/2011. In October 2016 the airline was awarded the European Regional Airlines Association Airline of the Year award and was commended for its constant growth and expansion into new markets.

See also
 Binter Mediterraneo, a former sister airline of Binter Canarias.
 Navegacion y Servicios Aéreos Canarios, a former subsidiary of Binter Canarias.

References

External links

 Official website

Airlines established in 1989
Airlines of Spain
Transport in the Canary Islands
European Regions Airline Association
Companies of the Canary Islands
1989 establishments in Spain